Todd Owen Miller (born 1 October 2002) is a professional footballer who plays as a winger for Doncaster Rovers, on loan from Brighton & Hove Albion.

Career
Miller joined Colchester United from Dagenham & Redbridge at under-14 level. He was called up to the Colchester United first-team squad for the first time in March 2019 after impressing manager John McGreal. He was handed the shirt number 47. He earned a place on the bench for Colchester's League Two trip to Exeter City on 16 March 2019. He made his debut from the substitutes bench, coming on as an 87th-minute substitute for Courtney Senior in the 3–0 defeat for the U's. He became Colchester's youngest-ever first-team player when he came on at the age of 16 years and 166 days, surpassing the previous record held by Lindsay Smith by 48 days.

On 19 July 2019, Miller joined the academy and development squad of Premier League side Brighton & Hove Albion for an undisclosed fee, signing a three-year contract.

On 13 January 2023, Miller joined EFL League Two side Doncaster Rovers on loan for the remainder of the 2022-23 season.

Career statistics

References

2002 births
Living people
Association football wingers
Dagenham & Redbridge F.C. players
Colchester United F.C. players
Brighton & Hove Albion F.C. players
Doncaster Rovers F.C. players
English Football League players
English footballers